This is a list of all personnel changes for the 2014 Indian Premier League. This was the second season to have all players, apart from a selection of retained players, return to the auction pool (first in 2011).

Retirement

Retained players
All teams were allowed to retain a maximum of five players (at most four Indian capped players) and the rest of the players entered the auction pool. Teams had until 10 January 2014 to announce their list of retained players.

Auction
The players auction took place on 12 and 13 February at Bangalore. On 12 February, capped players (players that were selected to play for their home country anytime before) were auctioned. Next day uncapped players were auctioned. Franchise-selected unsold capped and uncapped players were auctioned at the end of 2nd day.

A total of 912 players entered the auction. On 29 January 2014, the first list of 233 capped players was announced in the auction but the list did not contain any Pakistani players while big names such as Michael Clarke, Stuart Broad and Kumar Sangakkara were conspicuous by their absence. On 30 January 2014, the list was updated with uncapped players making a long list of 895 players (224 capped and 651 uncapped) which had to be shortlisted by IPL teams for auction by 3 February. Pinal Shah who was mistakenly added in the list of capped players in first list was moved to list of uncapped players. Three international associate players were kept in list of uncapped players but Ryan ten Doeschate, only associate player who has played in IPL, was kept in the list of capped players. The list was shortlisted to 514 players including 219 capped players (50 Indians and 169 overseas players) and 292 uncapped players (255 Indians and 37 overseas players) by IPL teams. Three associate capped players including Ryan ten Doeschate were kept under the uncapped section. Seventeen players (6 capped foreigners and 10 uncapped Indians) including names like Kemar Roach and Rikki Clarke who were not in the initial player lists were also added to the final auction list. After withdrawal of three capped players, the list was further shortened to 511 players (216 capped and 295 uncapped).

Summary
154 players (104 Indians and 50 Overseas) were sold at auction. Kevin Pietersen was the most costly foreign player. Many prominent Indian players such as Praveen Kumar, Subramaniam Badrinath, Abhimanyu Mithun and R. P. Singh remain unsold. Almost all current Sri Lankan and English cricketers including the names of Mahela Jayawardene, Tillakaratne Dilshan, Ian Bell and Alex Hales remain unsold.

 Maximum overseas players: 9;  Maximum squad size: 27; Budget:₹60 Crore

Sold players
The players were auctioned in sets. Sets 1 and 2 consisted of marquee players such as Virender Sehwag, Yuvraj Singh, Jacques Kallis and Kevin Pietersen. Other players, capped (sets 3–24) and uncapped (sets 25–53) were categorized according to their specialisation:

Source:Pepsi IPL 2014 Player Auction 
Key to sets
 BA: Batsman
 FA: Fast bowler
 SP: Spin bowler
 AL: All-rounder
 M: Marquee player
 U: Uncapped player

 LAT: Players who were not in the initial player lists but were added directly in the final auction list.
 RTM: Players bought using Rights to Match Card.
 REC: Players unsold originally in their sets but brought back and bought from Recalled List.

Unsold players
The following players remained unsold at the end of the two-day auction.

Capped

 200 lakhs
  Brett Lee
  Alex Hales
  Samit Patel
  Praveen Kumar
  Angelo Mathews
  Mahela Jayawardena
  Tillakaratne Dilshan
  Marlon Samuels
 150 lakhs
  Brad Hogg
  Cameron White
  Craig Kieswetter
  Luke Wright
  Rikki Clarke
  Rangana Herath
 100 lakhs
  Adam Voges
  Clinton McKay
  Daniel Christian
  David Hussey
  Dirk Nannes
  Matthew Wade
  Nathan Lyon
  Phillip Hughes
  Robert Quiney
  Shaun Tait
  Azhar Mahmood
  Ian Bell
  Ravi Bopara
  Manpreet Gony
  RP Singh
  Subramaniam Badrinath
  Jesse Ryder
  Kyle Mills
  Nathan McCullum
  Imran Tahir
  Johan Botha
  Robin Peterson
  Ryan McLaren
  Vernon Philander
  Sachithra Senanayake
  Fidel Edwards
  Kemar Roach
 50 lakhs
  Ben Rohrer
  Callum Ferguson
  Doug Bollinger
  Jackson Bird
  Luke Pomersbach
  Tim Paine
  Travis Birt
  Tamim Iqbal
  Dimitri Mascarenhas
  Jade Dernbach
  Abhimanyu Mithun
  Munaf Patel
  Hamish Rutherford
  James Franklin
  Martin Guptill
  Dean Elgar
  Herschelle Gibbs
  Neil McKenzie
  Nicky Boje
  Richard Levi
  Rory Kleinveldt
  Vaughn van Jaarsveld
  Ajantha Mendis
  Dilshan Munaweera
  Jeevan Mendis
  Kusal Janith Perera
  Lahiru Thirimanne
  Nuwan Kulasekara
  Prasanna Jayawardene
  Shaminda Eranga
  Suranga Lakmal
  Christopher Barnwell
  Darren Bravo
  Kieran Powell
  Lendl Simmons
  Sheldon Cottrell
 30 lakhs
  Andrew McDonald
  Ben Laughlin
  Fawad Ahmed
  James Muirhead
  Mohammad Mahmudullah
  Sohag Gazi
  Simon Jones
  Aavishkar Salvi
  Abhinav Mukund
  Hemang Badani
  Joginder Sharma
  Mohammad Kaif
  Pankaj Singh
  Ramesh Powar
  Sudeep Tyagi
  VRV Singh
  Wasim Jaffer
  Adam Milne
  Colin Munro
  Grant Elliott
  Hamish Bennett
  Ian Butler
  Jacob Oram
  Luke Ronchi
  Mitchell McClenaghan
  Neil Broom
  Dane Vilas
  David Wiese
  Farhaan Behardien
  Henry Davids
  Juan Theron
  Justin Ontong
  Lonwabo Tsotsobe
  Roelof van der Merwe
  Akila Dananjaya
  Angelo Perera
  Chamara Kapugedera
  Dilruwan Perera
  Farveez Maharoof
  Isuru Udana
  Jehan Mubarak
  Kaushal Silva
  Nuwan Pradeep
  Suraj Randiv
  Upul Tharanga
  Adrian Barath
  Andre Fletcher
  Ashley Nurse
  Danza Hyatt
  Denesh Ramdin
  Devendra Bishoo
  Garey Mathurin
  Jerome Taylor
  Johnson Charles
  Nikita Miller
  Rayad Emrit
  Sulieman Benn
  Tino Best
  Elton Chigumbura

Uncapped

 100 lakhs
  Michael Klinger
 30 lakhs
  Aiden Blizzard
  Cameron Gannon
  Craig Simmons
  Gurinder Sandhu
  Jason Behrendorff
  Nathan Reardon
  Nathan Rimmington
  Peter Nevill
  Sean Abbott
  Steven Crook
  Ali Murtaza
  Arjun Yadav
  Ashok Menaria
  Eklavya Dwivedi
  Faiz Fazal
  Hanuma Vihari
  Iresh Saxena
  Mahesh Rawat
  Mohnish Mishra
  Nitin Saini
  Rajagopal Sathish
  Sunny Singh
  Syed Mohammed
  Tirumalasetti Suman
  Vidyut Sivaramakrishnan
  Kevin O'Brien
  Niall O'Brien
  Dwaine Pretorius
  Jon-Jon Smuts
  Rilee Rossouw
 20 lakhs
  Aaron O'Brien
  Marcus Stoinis
  Michael Neser
  Mohammad Azharullah
  Abhishek Jhunjhunwala
  Akshath Reddy
  Anand Rajan
  Aniket Choudhary
  Anustup Majumdar
  Arindam Ghosh
  Arun Karthik
  B. Sumanth
  Biplab Samantray
  Bipul Sharma
  Dwaraka Ravi Teja
  Harmeet Singh Bansal
  Harpreet Singh
  Imtiyaz Ahmed
  Jiwanjot Singh
  Rahul Dewan
  Rakesh Dhruv
  Robin Bist
  Rohan Prem
  Sachin Baby
  Shailender Gehlot
  Sheldon Jackson
  Shreevats Goswami
  Shrikant Wagh
  Sourav Sarkar
  Sunny Sohal
  VA Jagadeesh
  Yogesh Nagar
  Nicholas Beard
  Craig Alexander
  Dillon Du Preez
  Reeza Hendricks
  Stiaan van Zyl
  Evin Lewis
  Jonathan Carter
  Kyle Mayers
  Miguel Cummins
  Nicholas Pooran
  Raymon Reifer
  Ronsford Beaton
 10 lakhs
  Abdulahad Malik
  Abhishek Bhat
  Abhishek Hegde
  Abid Nabi
  Abrar Anjum Kazi
  Aditya Waghmode
  Ajitesh Argal
  Akash Bhandari
  Akhil Herwadkar
  Akshay Darekar
  Akshdeep Nath
  Amit Verma
  Amit Yadav
  Amitoze Singh
  Aniruddha Ashok Joshi
  Ankit Bawne
  Ankit Keshri
  Ankit Rajpoot
  Ankit Tiwari
  Anupam Sanklecha
  Anwar Ahmed Khan
  Aristh Singhvi
  Asad Ullah Khan Pathan
  Aswin Crist
  Aushik Srinivas
  Avi Barot
  Avinash Yadav
  Baba Indrajith
  Baltej Singh
  Balwinder Sandhu
  Basant Mohanty
  Bharat Chipli
  Bhargav Bhatt
  Bhargav Merai
  Chirag Jani
  Chovvakkaran Shahid
  David Mathias
  Deepak Chahar
  Dhruv Singh
  Dinesh Salunkhe
  Gajendra Singh
  Ganesh Satish
  Gurinder Singh
  Hardik Pandya
  Hardik Rathod
  Harmeet Singh
  Harshad Khadiwale
  Himalaya Barad
  Ian Dev Singh
  Ishank Jaggi
  Jaskaran Singh
  Jaskarandeep Singh Buttar
  Javed Khan
  Javed Khan
  Kamran Khan
  Karan Goel
  Kedar Devdhar
  Kona Srikar Bharat
  KP Appanna
  Kshemal Waingankar
  Kuldeep Raval
  Kumar Deobrat
  Kunal Kapoor
  M Mohammed
  Malolan Rangarajan
  Manan Sharma
  Mayank Tehlan
  Mohammed Abdul Khader
  Mohit Sharma
  Mukul Dagar
  Murtuja Vahora
  Natraj Behera
  Nikhil Anant Patil
  Nikhil Gangta
  Nikhil Naik
  Nitish Rana
  Niyas Nizar
  Padmanabhan Prasanth
  Parag Khanapurkar
  Paras Dogra
  Pardeep Sahu
  Paresh Patel
  Parvinder Singh
  Paul Valthaty
  Prashant Chopra
  Prashant Naik
  Prathamesh Ganesh Dake
  Pratyush Singh
  Pritam Das
  R Karthikeyan
  R Samarth
  Rahil Shah
  Raiphi Vincent Gomez
  Rajesh Bishnoi
  Rajoo Bhatkal
  Rajwinder Singh
  Ram Dayal Punia
  Ramaswamy Prasanna
  Reagan Pinto
  Rituraj Singh
  Royston Dias
  Ryan Ninan
  S Thiyagrajan
  Sagar Jogiyani
  Samad Fallah
  Samar Quadri
  Samiullah Beigh
  Sangram Atitkar
  Sarabjit Ladda
  Saurabh Kumar
  Saurabh Netravalkar
  Saurabh Wakaskar
  Selvam Suresh Kumar
  Shoaib Shabib Shaikh
  Shrikant Mundhe
  Shubham Khajuria
  Shubham Ranjane
  Siddharth Chitnis
  Siddhesh Lad
  Smit Patel
  Saurasish Lahiri
  Sreenath Aravind
  Sujit Nayak
  Sumeet Verma
  Sumit Narwal
  Sunil Raju
  Sunny Gupta
  Suraj Yadav
  Swapnil Asnodkar
  Syed Quadri
  Tanmay Srivastava
  Taruwar Kohli
  Uday Kaul
  Udit Birla
  Udit Brijesh Patel
  Umar Nazir Mir
  Varun Sood
  Vinoop Manoharan
  Vishal Dabholkar
  Vishant More
  Vivek Singh
  Vijaykumar Yo Mahesh
  Cameron Delport
  Davy Jacobs
  Hardus Viljoen
  Robert Frylinck

 LAT: Players who were not in the initial player lists but were added directly in the final auction list.

Source:Pepsi IPL 2014 Player Auction

Withdrawn players
The following players were in the final auction but list withdrew from the tournament before the auction.

Non-shortlisted players
List of players who were part of auction list on 30 January 2014 but were not shortlisted for the auction. The list consisted of 31 overseas players with 3 having previously played in IPL. 12 domestic Indian players who had previously played IPL also failed to get shortlisted. There were 355 other domestic players including 321 from India.

Capped

 200 lakhs
  James Pattinson
  Dhammika Prasad
 100 lakhs
  Brian Vitori
  Usman Khawaja
 50 lakhs
  Tawanda Mupariwa
  Jason Krejza
 30 lakhs
  Anamul Haque
  Nasir Hossain
  Rubel Hossain
  Gulam Bodi
  Justin Kemp
  Yusuf Abdulla
  Ashan Priyanjan
  Dilhara Fernando
  Dilhara Lokuhettige
  Dimuth Karunaratne
  Kaushal Lokuarachchi
  Kosala Kulasekara
  Mahela Udawatte
  Ramith Rambukwella
  Sajeewa Weerakoon
  Seekkuge Prasanna
  Tharanga Paranavitana
  Carlos Brathwaite
  Shannon Gabriel
  Veerasammy Permaul
  Hamilton Masakadza
  Prosper Utseya
  Tinashe Panyangara
 WNA
  Carlton Baugh
  Christopher Mpofu

Uncapped

 30 lakhs
  Cameron Boyce
  Evan Gulbis
  Joe Mennie
  Tom Cooper
  Dheeraj Jadhav
  Pinal Shah
  Abhimanyu Khod
  Alok Sharma
  Jaydev Shah
  Sangram Singh
  Derek De Boorder
 20 lakhs
  Andrew Tye
  Kurtis Patterson
  Michael Hill
  Trent Lawford
  Arindam Das
  Paidikalva Vijaykumar
  Puneet Bisht
  A.G Pradeep
  Abhishek Das
  Akshay Wakhare
  Ameya Jayprakesh Shrikhande
  Amit Vashisth
  Arnab Nandi
  Avilin Gosh
  Ayyappa Bandaru
  D. Siva Kumar
  Gonnabattula Chiranjeevi
  Prashant Gupta
  Sandeep Singh
  Sarul Kanwar
  Shatrunjay Gaekwad
  Solanki Rakesh Kuntikil
  Vaibhav Deshpande
  Andrew Birch
  Shadley Van Schalkwyk
  John Campbell
  Shane Dowrich
 10 lakhs
  Clive Rose
  Jonathan Wells
   Thalaivan Sargunam
  Ganapathi Vignesh
  KB Pawan
  Krishnakant Upadhyay
  Nayan Doshi
  PM Sarvesh Kumar
  Rajesh Pawar
  Rohan Raje
  Rohit Motwani
  Vikrant Yeligati
  Wilkin Mota
  A.C Prathiban
  A.Lalith Mohan
  Aakarshit Gomel
  Aatish Bhalaik
  Abhijit Karambelkar
  Abhilash Mallick
  Abhimanyu Rana
  Abhinav Bali
  Abhinav Kumar
  Abhishek Gupta
  Abhishek Mohan S.L
  Abhishek Vivek Choursia
  Adil Reshi
  Adithya B Sagar
  Aditya Anand Sarvate
  Aditya Kaushik
  Aditya Shanware
  Afroz Khan
  Ajay Yadav
  Akash Yadav
  Akbar Sabir Khan
  Akshay Venkatesh
  Alfred Christopher Absolom
  Alok Chandra Sahoo
  Alok Pratap Singh
  Amanpreet Singh
  Amardeep Sonkar
  Amit Parashar
  Amogh Sunil Desai
  Amol Ganesh Jungade
  Amol Shinde
  Amol Vishwasrao Ubarhande
  Anand Singh
  Ankur Julka
  Anup Revandkar
  Anzaz Ansari
  Aquib Shaikh
  Arish Alam
  Arjit Gupta
  Arlen Konwar
  Arpit Vasavada
  Arup Das
  Ashish Hooda
  Ashish Yadav
  Ashish Yadav
  Ashwin Murugan
  Azeem Akhtar
  B. Anirudha
  B. Sandeep
  Barinder Singh Sran
  Beant Singh
  Bhavesh Baria
  Bhavin J Thakkar
  Bodavarapu Sudhakar
  Bravish Shetty
  Buddhadev Mangaldas
  C Ramesh
  Chandrapal Singh Chundawat
  Chandrasekar Ganapathi
  Charanjit Singh
  Chetan Bist
  Chirag Khurana
  D.B Prasanth Kumar
  Danny Derek Prince
  Darshan Misal
  Debabrata Dutta
  Deepak Bansal
  Deepak Chougule
  Deepak Ranjan Behera
  Dharmender Devender Ahlawat
  Dhiren Mistry
  Dhruv Raval
  Dhruv Shorey
  Domnic Joseph Muthuswamy
  Eknath Dinesh Kerkar
  Farman Ahmed
  Gagan Singh Natt
  Garikina Venkatasatya
  Gaurav Gambhir
  Gauresh Mahadev Gawas
  Gitansh Khera
  Gitimoy Basu
  Gokul Sharma
  Govinda Poddar
  Govrav Dessai
  Gurvinder Singh
  Habeeb Ahmed
  Harish Kakani
  Harshad Gadekar
  Hiken Naresh Shah
  Himanshu Chawla
  Himanshu Satyawan
  Hrishikesh Naik
  J Kaushik
  Jagrit Anand
  Janmajay Sanjay Acharya
  Jay Nayak
  Jayojit Basu
  Jesal Karia
  Jitendra Patil
  Jyot Bhagyesh Chhaya
  K Gowtham
  K.H Gopinath
  Kallal Maitra
  Kamal Passi
  Kamlesh Thakor
  Kanwar Abhinay
  Kaunain Abbas
  Kaustubh Rawalnath Pawar
  KC Avinash
  Keenan Vaz
  Keshav Kumar
  Ketul Pravindhai Patel
  Kishore Martin Sanjeev
  Koyya Bharat Reddy
  KR Sreejith
  Krunal Pandya
  Kshitiz Sharma
  Kuldeep Diwan
  Kuldeep Hooda
  Kuldeep Rawat
  Kunwarveer Raina
  Lokesh Sharma
  Lukman Iqbal Meriwala
  M Prabhu
  M.K Sivakumar
  Madhur Khatri
  Majid Dhar
  Malvi Usman Rizwan
  Mandeep Mohan Singh
  Maneik Mohil
  Mani Sankar Singh
  Manish Nagesh Rao
  Mayank Sidana
  Mehdi Hasan Syed
  Mehul Balubhai Patel
  Miten Ketan Shah
  Mitesh Rane
  Mohammad Amir Khan
  Mohammed Mudhasir
  Mohd. Ahmed
  Mohit Thadani
  Mohsin M Sayyad
  Monil Kantilal Patel
  Murtuza Hussain
  Murumulla U Bhaskar Sriram
  N.C Aiyappa
  Napoleon Einstein
  Naresh Nama
  Naushad Shafi Shaikh
  Naved Ahmed
  Neeraj Bist
  Neil Narvekar
  Nikhil Doru
  Nikhilesh Surendran
  Nikit Dhumal
  Nikunj Sanjay Mohite
  Nipun Malhotra
  Niranjan Behera
  Onkar Gurav
  P. Inder Shekar Reddy
  P. Kaneshkk Naidu
  Palani Amarnath
  Paramveer Singh
  Pavan Ramlal Kahar
  Piyush Tanwar
  PM Anfal
  Pranav Gupta
  Pranay Sharma
  Prashant Awaasthi
  Prateek Pawar
  Pratik Jumar Ghodadra
  Pratyush Chatterji
  Praveen Gupta
  Pravesh Chikara
  Prinnan Dutta
  Priyank Tehlan
  PU Anthaf
  Puneet Mehra
  Puneet Yadav
  Rahul Ajay Tripathi
  Rahul Dagar
  Rahul Dalal
  Rahul Mishra
  Rahul Singh Gahlaut
  Rahul Vijay Keni
  Rahul Yadav
  Rajamani Jesuraj
  Rajat Paliwal
  Rajshekar Harikant
  Raju Kumar
  Rakesh Mishra
  Rakesh Pramod Prabhu
  Rameez Khan
  Ranjeet Mali
  Ranjeet Satish Paradkar
  Ravi Dhoopnarayan Thakur
  Ravi Goswami
  Ravi Jangid
  Ravi Kant Shukla
  Ravi Kiran Majeti
  Ravi-Inder Singh
  Rishit Saini
  Robert Fernandez
  Rohit Choudhary
  Rohit Devidas Asnodkar
  Rohit Jhalani
  Rujul Haren Bhatt
  Sachin Malav
  Sachin Mohan
  Sadiq Hassan Kirmani
  Sagan Kamat
  Sagar Naik
  Sagar Udeshi
  Sagiar Vijay Trivedi
  Sahil S Dhuri
  Saketh Sairam Palakodet
  Samarth Singh
  Sandeep Bhandari
  Sandeep Gupta
  Sandipan Das
  Sanjay Badhwar
  Santosh Shivram Shinde
  Sarvesh Damle
  Satyam Choudhary
  Saurabh Bandekar
  Saurabh Passi
  Sayad Badiuzzama
  Shahid Iqbal Shaikh
  Shailesh Dubli
  Shalabh Shrivastava
  Shamsuzama M Kazy
  Sharad Lumba
  Shasank Singh
  Shelly Shaurya
  Shib Sankar Paul
  Shiv Prakash Gautam
  Shiva Kant Shukla
  Shivram Rajesh Dube
  Shubek Singh Gill
  Sibsankar Roy
  Siddarth Saraf
  Siddhesh Sunil Neral
  Sinan Abdul Khader
  SL Akshay
  Sourabh Chouan
  Stephen Cheepurapalli
  Subhomoy Das
  Subramanzan Doraiswany
  Sudip Chatterjee
  Sufiyan Mehboob Shaikh
  Sumanth Kolla
  Sumiran Amonkar
  Sumit Kalia
  Sumit Meher
  Sumit Ruikar
  Sundeep Rajan Vadivelu
  Sunil Sam
  Sunny Sehrawat
  Sunny Shokeen
  Suraj Dongre
  Surya Prakesh Suwalka
  Suryakanta Pradhan
  Swapnil Anil Pradhan
  Swapnil Bandiwar
  Swapnil Gugale
  Swapnil Salvi
  Swapnil Singh
  Swapnil V Naik
  Syed Mohammed Shoaib Maqsusi
  Syed Shahabuddin
  Tanveer Ulhaq
  Tarjinder Singh
  Tushar Narvekar
  U. Sushil
  Umang Sharma
  Urvesh Patel
  Utkarsh B Patel
  Vaibhav Rawal
  Vaibhav Sharma
  Varun Khanna
  Vikas Mishra
  Vikas Tokas
  Vikram Dahiya
  Vinay Galetiya
  Vinett Saxena
  Vinit Indulkar
  Vinu Prasad N.
  Vishal Bhatia
  Vishwanath M Parmar
  Vishwas Bhalla
  Waqar Ahmed
  Yatharth Tomar
  Yogesh Kumar
  Yogesh Subhash Pawar
  Christiaan Jonker
  Daryn Smit
  Hendrick Van der Dussen
  Khayelihle Zondo
  Ryan Bailey
  Simon Harmer
  Chaminda Bandara
  Janaka Gunarathna
  Milinda Siriwardana
  Roshen Silva
  Sachith Pathirana
  Saliya Saman
  Shehan Jayasuriya
  Vishwa Fernando
  Navin Stewart
  Steven Jacobs
  Trevon Griffith
 WNA
  Abhishek Raut
  Salman Ahmed
  Ayabulela Gqamane
  Keshav Athmanand Maharaj

 WNA:Was Not Announced- Reserve price were not announced for the players
 Sandeep Singh, Haryana Wicket-keeper batsman was on Auction list but died in an accident before final list was announced

Withdrawn players
The following players withdrew from the tournament either due to injuries or because of other reasons.

Replacement signings
Players were signed as replacement of contracted players who were not available to play due to injuries and national commitments. Under IPL rules, the replacements have to be chosen from the pool of players who went unsold in the auction, and cannot be paid more than the players they are replacing, though they can be paid less.

References

External links
 IPL 2014 Auction Day 1 coverage on Wisden India
 IPL 2014 Auction Day 2 coverage on Wisden India
 IPL 2014 player salary

Indian Premier League personnel changes
2014 Indian Premier League